Johanna Reichert (born 31 December 2001) is an Austrian handballer for Thüringer HC and the Austrian national team.

She represented Austria at the 2021 World Women's Handball Championship, placing 16th.

References

2001 births
Living people
Austrian female handball players
People from Korneuburg
Sportspeople from Lower Austria